Salcott or Salcott cum Virley is a village and civil parish in the Colchester borough of Essex, England, and forms part of the Winstred Hundred grouped parish council. It is adjacent to Tolleshunt Knights, Tollesbury and Great Wigborough, near Tiptree.

References

Villages in Essex
Civil parishes in Essex
Borough of Colchester